Due West Female College was a private Presbyterian women's college that operated in Due West, South Carolina, USA from 1859 until 1927, when it merged with Erskine College.

Due West was founded by a mixed group of lay men and local leaders from the Associate Reformed Presbyterian Church.  Its first president was Dr. John Irwin Bonner, who had founded the first ARP Church in the town.  Although some of its founders were affiliated with the church, the college did not have an official denominational affiliation until it was bought by the ARP Church in 1904.

The college's original mission was to educate women to become teachers in the Greater Abbeville County area.  Over time, however, Due West began to attract students from throughout the Southern United States, including from as far away as Texas.  The New York Times noted in 1906 that the college and its surrounding town had become known as the most "strait-laced" place in America, with the "damsels" of the Due West Female College being "as well behaved and as proper as members of the faculty."

Due West had been closely linked to another college in town, Erskine College, since its founding.  When the better-known Erskine became fully coeducational in 1899, Due West experienced a decline in enrollment.  In 1925, Due West agreed to merge with Erskine, which helped the coeducational college receive its first accreditation from the Southern Association of Colleges.  The colleges officially merged in 1927, with Due West closing in 1928.

See also
 List of current and historical women's universities and colleges in the United States
 List of university and college mergers in the United States

References
 Edgar, Walter B.  South Carolina: A History.  University of South Carolina Press.  1998.
 "Erskine College Fact Sheet."  Erskine College.  Accessed February 16, 2008.
 Songe, Alice H.  American Universities and Colleges: A Dictionary of Name Changes.  1978.
 "Where Vice Is Not and Holiness Reigns" (PDF).  The New York Times.  January 2, 1906.

External links
 Erskine College
 Abbeville County History

Education in Abbeville County, South Carolina
Defunct private universities and colleges in South Carolina
Educational institutions established in 1875
Former women's universities and colleges in the United States
Educational institutions disestablished in 1928
Erskine College
1875 establishments in South Carolina
History of South Carolina
History of women in South Carolina